Handball at the 2014 Summer Youth Olympics was held from 20 to 25 August at the Jiangning Sports Center in Nanjing, China.

Qualification

A total of 6 teams will participate in each gender. Each National Olympic Committee (NOC) can enter a maximum of 2 teams of 14 athletes, 1 per each gender. As hosts, China is given the choice of entering a male or female team while the other places shall be decided by qualification events, namely five continental qualification tournaments.

China chose to enter a girls' team therefore the unoccupied boys' team was reallocated to the best placed continent at the 2013 Men's Youth World Handball Championship (Europe). Furthermore Oceania did not organize a qualifying event for either gender thus the spots were reallocated.

To be eligible to participate at the Youth Olympics athletes must have been born between 1 January 1996 and 31 December 1998. Furthermore, all qualified NOCs must either have a senior ranking in the top 40 on 1 January 2014 or finish ahead of a team ranked in the top 20 during the continental qualification tournament.

Boys

Girls

Schedule

The schedule was released by the Nanjing Youth Olympic Games Organizing Committee.

All times are CST (UTC+8)

Medal summary

Medal table

Events

References

External links
Official Results Book – Handball

 
2014 Summer Youth Olympics events
Youth Summer Olympics
2014
International handball competitions hosted by China